Demarest House is located in River Edge, Bergen County, New Jersey, United States. The house was added to the National Register of Historic Places on January 10, 1983, as part of the Early Stone Houses of Bergen County Multiple Property Submission (MPS).

History
The Demarest House Museum is a two-room sandstone cottage that was built in 1794 for miller John Paulson at the time of his marriage to Altie Ely. The stove chimney in east room is a technological advance over fireplaces. The house was moved from original site beside French Burial Ground in New Milford in 1955–56 to River Edge, New Jersey, about one mile southwest. It is owned by the Blauvelt-Demarest Foundation, which restored the house in 2009.

The Demarest House Museum, the Campbell-Christie House and the Thomas-Westervelt Barn are on the Bergen County Historical Society's property at Historic New Bridge Landing. The Steuben House is a state-historic site on one acre at Historic New Bridge Landing.

See also
National Register of Historic Places listings in Bergen County, New Jersey

References

External links
 
 Demarest House Museum - Bergen County Historical Society

Houses on the National Register of Historic Places in New Jersey
Houses in Bergen County, New Jersey
National Register of Historic Places in Bergen County, New Jersey
River Edge, New Jersey
Museums in Bergen County, New Jersey
Historic house museums in New Jersey
New Jersey Register of Historic Places
Relocated buildings and structures in New Jersey
Historic district contributing properties in New Jersey
Individually listed contributing properties to historic districts on the National Register in New Jersey
Stone houses in New Jersey